Endra Mulyana Mulyajaya (born 11 April) is an Indonesian former badminton player, who now works as a badminton coach. Trained at the Tangkas club, he clinched the boys' doubles titles at the Dutch and German partnered with Hadi Saputra in 1996, and also settled a bronze medal at the World Junior Championships in Silkeborg, Denmark. In 1998, he won the mixed doubles title at the Jakarta International tournament partnered with Angeline de Pauw. Together with Saputra, he finished as a semi finalists at the World Grand Prix tournament 1999 Thailand Open. In 2000, Mulyajaya teammed-up with Nova Widianto, the duo competed in the Grand Prix event and became a quarter finalists at the Indonesia, Malaysia and Dutch Open.

Mulyajaya started his career as a coach in Tangkas club for three years, and later join the Badminton Association of Indonesia for five years. In 2018, he moved as a coach in Turkey.

Achievements

World Junior Championships 
Boys' doubles

IBF International 
Men's doubles

Mixed doubles

References

Bibliography

External links 
 

Living people
Year of birth missing (living people)
Indonesian male badminton players
Badminton coaches